The men's long jump event at the 2005 European Athletics U23 Championships was held in Erfurt, Germany, at Steigerwaldstadion on 15 and 16 July.

Medalists

Results

Final
16 July

Qualifications
15 July
Qualifying 7.75 or 12 best to the Final

Group A

Group B

Participation
According to an unofficial count, 20 athletes from 14 countries participated in the event.

 (1)
 (1)
 (2)
 (1)
 (1)
 (2)
 (1)
 (1)
 (3)
 (2)
 (1)
 (1)
 (2)
 (1)

References

Long jump
Long jump at the European Athletics U23 Championships